Düringer is a surname. Notable people with the surname include:

 Annemarie Düringer (1925–2014), Swiss actress
 Hans Düringer (died 1477), German clockmaker
 Roland Düringer (born 1963), Austrian actor, cabarettist, and political activist